Barnim III the Great (14 August 1368) was a Pomeranian duke from the Griffin dynasty.

Life
He ruled Pomerania-Stettin in the years 1344–1368, although he had been a co-regent of his father Otto I since 1320, taking a prominent part in the defence and government of the duchy. Aiming for independence from the Margraviate of Brandenburg, he allied himself with Poland and Bohemia. In 1338 Brandenburg relinquished supremacy over Pomerania, and in 1348 Charles IV recognized the duchy as a fiefdom of the Holy Roman Empire, which helped to protect it from the Brandenburg margraves. The civil war in Brandenburg in the years 1349–1354 allowed Barnim III to extend his duchy by conquest. He was first dux Cassuborum Duke of Kashubians.

Marriage and issue 
Barnim III married Agnes ( – before or in 1371), a daughter of Duke Henry II of Brunswick-Grubenhagen.  They had four children:
 Otto  (d. 1337)
 Casimir III (1348 – 24 August 1372)
 Swantibor III ( – 21 June 1413)
 Bogislaw VII (before 1366 – 1404)

Ancestry

See also
List of Pomeranian duchies and dukes
History of Pomerania
Duchy of Pomerania
House of Pomerania

External links

Barnim III 
Attribution:

 

14th-century births
1368 deaths
Dukes of Pomerania
People from Szczecin
14th-century German nobility